is a  mountain on the border of Saijō and Kumakōgen, in Ehime, Japan. This mountain is one of the 100 famous mountains in Japan.  It is the highest mountain in Western Japan and the island of Shikoku.

Outline 
Mount Ishizuchi is the highest mountain on the island of Shikoku and also the highest mountain west of Mount Haku.  It is known as 'the roof of Shikoku' and the sharp, rocky summit resembles a huge . 

Mount Ishizuchi is an important object of worship in this region and one of the major centers of Shugendō, a sect of mixture of Shinto and Buddhism. At the top of the mountain there is a small shrine called the Ishizuchi Shrine. There are several sets of  leading up to the summit and this is the route many pilgrims opt to take, the longest set being 68m. However, it is possible to hike all the way to the peak along a trail which includes stairs and ramps with handrails.  

The climbing season opens every year on July 1, and women are forbidden from climbing the mountain on this day. Between mid-October and mid-November, people come from far and wide to view the autumn colours.

The area around Mount Ishizuchi is a major part of Ishizuchi Quasi-National Park.

Access 
 Sanchōjōju Station of Ishizuchi Ropeway
 Ishizuchi Tsuchigoya Bus Stop of Iyotetsu Bus

Footnotes

References 
 Guide to the Ishizuchi Mountains (Saijo City)
 the Geographical Survey Institute in Japan
 Ishizuchi Quasi-National Park
 ‘Yama to Shinko: Ishizuchisan’

External links 

 

Ishizuchi
Ishizuchi
Ishizuchi
Ishizuchi
Ishizuchi
Ishizuchi